Love Records was a record label from Finland established in 1966 by .  It specialized in Finnish rock and also released jazz, leftist political songs, and ethnic music.

Love released 384 LPs, 253 C-cassettes, 347 singles and 24 EPs. It was founded in October 1966 by journalist , jazz drummer Christian Schwindt and composer and all-round music personality Henrik Otto Donner. The first release was an LP consisting of the songs of Kaj Chydenius, sung by  Kaisa Korhonen, Kalle Holmberg and Vesa-Matti Loiri. One of the most important rock bands of the early Love Records was Blues Section, which later on spawned such classic bands of Finnish progressive rock as Wigwam and Tasavallan Presidentti, who also released their records on Love. The famous Love Records logo was designed by Harri Manner.

In the 1970s Love Records released most of the important Finnish rock bands and artists: Suomen Talvisota 1939-1940, Pekka Streng, Rauli Badding Somerjoki, Hector, Hurriganes, Dave Lindholm, Juice Leskinen, Kaseva, Maarit; more progressive rock bands such as Tabula Rasa, Finnforest and Piirpauke; "the godfather of Finnish underground", M.A. Numminen; and later on also such punk and new wave artists as Maukka Perusjätkä, and also Briard and Pelle Miljoona, which were Andy McCoy's bands before Hanoi Rocks .

Often these were cabaret-type songs in the tradition of Bertolt Brecht and Kurt Weill or even Finnish translations of the songs by Brecht and Weill.

Love Records went bankrupt in 1979. Their last release was Kari Peitsamo's album . Atte Blom continued after Love with his new label, Johanna Kustannus.

On July 4, 2016 the label was resurrected with the release of Ville Valo's single "Olet mun kaikuluotain".

See also 
 List of record labels

References

Further reading
 Love Records 1966–1979 by Miska Rantanen. (Helsinki: Schildts 2005)

External links
 Official site
 Love Records discography
 Love Records discography
 Partial Love Records discography @ pHinnWeb

Finnish record labels
Record labels established in 1966
Record labels disestablished in 1979
Rock record labels
Jazz record labels